Exile and the Kingdom (2006) is the debut solo album from Canadian singer/songwriter Jeff Martin. The title is derived from the 1957 book of the same name by Albert Camus.

Track listing
All songs are written by Jeff Martin, except track 1 by Jeff Martin, Michael Lee and Ritesh Das

"World is Calling" – 5:24
"Butterfly" – 3:31
"Where Do We Go from Here" – 3:37
"Daystar" – 3:59
"Lament" – 4:34
"Angeldust"  – 4:51
"Black Snake Blues" – 3:32
"Stay inside of Me" – 3:40
"The Kingdom" – 6:22
"Good Time Song"  – 3:18

Personnel

Recording personnel
Produced by Jeff Martin
Executive Producer Michael Lee Jackson
Associate Executive producers: Dr. Michael Virro, Perry Tapanainen
Recorded & engineered by Nick Blagona
Assistant engineers: Evan Ritchie, Barry Nolan
Mixed by: Nick Blagona & Jeff Martin
Assistant mix engineer: Luke Fountain
All songs recorded at Caroline Studios, Durrus, County Cork, Ireland
All songs mixed at Metalworks Recording Studio, Mississauga, Ontario, Canada
Mastered by Nick Blagona at Metalworks Recording Studios
Published by JMartin Music (SOCAN)

Musicians
"World is Calling":
Jeff Martin – vocals, electric guitars, bass guitar, emulator synthesizer, dumbek
Ritesh Das – tabla, chant.
Michael Lee – drums.
Marc Oulette – String arrangement & composition
"Butterfly":
Jeff Martin – vocals, acoustic guitars, electric guitars, bass guitar, Fender Telecaster B-bender, Hammond B3
Ritesh Das – udu
Michael Lee – drums
"Daystar":
Jeff Martin – vocals, acoustic guitars, electric guitars, bass guitar, sitar, sarod, tanpura, hurdy-gurdy, piano
Ritesh Das – tabla, dholak, dunun, udu
Michael Lee – Drums
"Lament":
Jeff Martin – vocals,  Ellis 7 string resonator guitar, electric guitars, bass guitar, E-bow, emulator synth
Ritesh Das – tabla, dunun
Michael Lee – Drums
Evan Ritchie – manjira
"Angeldust":
Jeff Martin – vocals, acoustic guitars, esraj emulator synth
Nick Blagona – shakers, hand drum
"Black Snake Blues":
Jeff Martin – vocals,  Ellis 7-string resonator guitar, bass guitar, banjo
Michael Lee – Drums
New Beginning Choral Ensenble
Rodney Appleby – choir vocal arrangement & conducting
"Stay inside of Me":
Jeff Martin – vocals, acoustic guitars, mandolin, emulator synth
Jenny Laws – Vocals
"The Kingdom":
Jeff Martin – vocals, acoustic guitars, electric guitars, bass guitar, mandolin, piano, Hammond B3, emulator synth
Ritesh Das – tabla, manjira
Michael Lee – Drums
Marc Oulette – string arrangement & composition
New Beginning Choral Ensemble
Rodney Appleby – choral vocal arrangement & conducting
Nick Blagona – tambourine
"Good Time Song":
Jeff Martin – vocals, acoustic guitars,  Ellis 7 string resonator guitar
Ritesh Das – table (yes, "table")
Larsen Liebig – double bass
Terry Scott – spoons

Charts

References

2006 albums
Jeff Martin (Canadian musician) albums
Shock Records albums